Massachusetts Avenue is a major diagonal transverse road in Washington, D.C., and the Massachusetts Avenue Historic District is a historic district that includes part of it.

Appearing in Peter Charles L'Enfant's original plan, Massachusetts Avenue crosses three of Washington's four quadrants.  It intersects every major north–south street and passes numerous Washington landmarks. It is a landmark itself, long considered the northern boundary of the downtown as well as home of Washington's Embassy Row.

The two roads run in parallel through much of the city, Massachusetts about seven blocks north of Pennsylvania. Massachusetts Avenue was long Washington's premier residential street, as Pennsylvania was once its most sought-after business address. Both streets were named after states with prominent roles in the American Revolution: Massachusetts and Pennsylvania.

The historic district is an  area that includes 150 contributing buildings and 3 contributing structures. It was listed on the National Register of Historic Places in 1985. It includes multiple properties that are individually listed on the National Register.

Route description

The main section of Massachusetts Avenue begins at 19th Street Southeast, just to the west of the former District of Columbia General Hospital site and one block north of Congressional Cemetery. At elevation with respect to the hospital, Massachusetts Avenue commands a view of the Anacostia River. It proceeds in a northwesterly direction crosstown. At Lincoln Park the road enters Northeast D.C. and the neighborhood of Capitol Hill. After briefly converging with Columbus Circle as it curves around Union Station, Massachusetts enters Northwest D.C. in a rapidly changing neighborhood which has transitioned from earlier blight and decay to in the 21st century developing numerous high-rise apartment complexes. In the tradition of the acronym SoHo, realtors sometimes give this area the moniker NoMa (North of Massachusetts Avenue).

It intersects with Interstate 395 (which runs underground at that point) at H Street NW, and passes over Mount Vernon Square in front of the Walter E. Washington Convention Center. Continuing northwest, Massachusetts enters an underpass below Thomas Circle at 14th and M Streets NW, before curving around Scott Circle at 16th and N Streets NW; this is considered the starting point of Embassy Row.

Massachusetts Avenue passes through the inner ring of Dupont Circle and curves north at Sheridan Circle, paralleling Rock Creek to Belmont Road NW. After crossing Rock Creek over the Charles C. Glover Bridge, it curves around the United States Naval Observatory and Number One Observatory Circle, the official residence of the Vice President of the United States, which forms the southwest boundary of the Massachusetts Heights neighborhood. The Washington National Cathedral, located at the intersection of Mass and Wisconsin Avenues, is usually considered the end of Embassy Row.

At Ward Circle, Massachusetts delineates the American University Park neighborhood from Spring Valley, passing to the north of American University. It crosses the Washington-Montgomery County, Maryland border at Westmoreland Circle. In Maryland, the road continues signed as State Highway 396, meandering through residential sections of Bethesda until terminating at Goldsboro Road (Maryland State Highway 614). Another section of Massachusetts Avenue, discontinuous from the one described above, lies on the east side of the Anacostia River. That section extends from 30th Street SE near District of Columbia Route 295, to Southern Avenue SE at the border between D.C. and Prince George's County.

Other notable institutions located on Massachusetts Avenue include the Postal Square Building (which houses the Bureau of Labor Statistics and the National Postal Museum), The Heritage Foundation, Georgetown University Law Center, the Islamic Center of Washington, the Cato Institute, the Paul H. Nitze School of Advanced International Studies (SAIS), the Brookings Institution, the Peterson Institute, St. Nicholas Cathedral, and the Carnegie Endowment for International Peace. Numerous embassies and residences are listed on the National Register of Historic Places, and the National Trust for Historic Preservation makes its home on Massachusetts Avenue.

History
The track of the avenue was not paved until the administration of Alexander Robey Shepherd in the early 1870s. It was extended beyond Boundary Road (now Florida Avenue) in the 1880s, and beyond Rock Creek up to Wisconsin Avenue after 1900. The District Commissioners approved extending it to the District line in 1906, although at the time they thought it would really only be used up to its intersection with Nebraska Avenue with the exception of pleasure drives. Residential development along Massachusetts Avenue accelerated in the 1870s, mostly around the circles located west of 9th Street NW. These brick and brownstone structures reflected the Queen Anne and Richardsonian Romanesque styles in vogue at the time. Later, luxurious Georgian Revival and Beaux-Arts mansions inhabited by wealthy and influential Washingtonians sprouted along the boulevard. The section between Sheridan Circle and Scott Circle became known as "Millionaires' Row".

 

The Great Depression forced many to relinquish their homes on Millionaires' Row. After World War II, Massachusetts Avenue was seen as less fashionable than newer areas such as upper 16th Street. Many residences were sold and demolished to make way for office buildings, particularly around Dupont Circle and to its east. Many others, however, survived as embassies and society houses; the former Millionaires' Row is today well known as Embassy Row.

Several overlapping historic district have been created to preserve the character of the remaining neighborhoods. The Massachusetts Avenue Historic District encompasses all buildings which front the road between 17th Street and Observatory Circle NW.

Transit
While no Washington Metro lines run along Massachusetts Avenue, the Metrobus N routes serve upper Northwest while a patchwork of routes serve Downtown, Northeast, and Southeast.

Metrobus
The following Metrobus routes travel along the street (listed from west to east):
 N4 (Dupont Circle to Westmoreland Circle)
 N6 (Dupont Circle to Westmoreland Circle, making a clockwise-only loop each direction between Idaho Avenue westbound/Cathedral Avenue eastbound and Ward Circle)
 N2 (Dupont Circle to Idaho Avenue westbound/Cathedral Avenue eastbound, crossing again at Ward Circle)
 80 (North Capitol Street to 2nd Street NW westbound/H Street NW eastbound)
 D6 (Stanton Park to North Capitol St.)
 X8 (Stanton Park to Columbus Circle)
 96 (D.C. General Hospital to Lincoln Park)
 M6 (Alabama Ave to Southern Ave)

D.C. Circulator
The D.C. Circulator travels along the street:
 Georgetown-Union Station (Columbus Circle to Mount Vernon Square)

Far western and eastern ends
Ride On Route 29 serves Massachusetts Avenue in Maryland from Westmoreland Circle to the avenue's terminus at Goldsboro Road.

The M6, which travels from the Potomac Avenue Metro station to Fairfax Village, runs along Massachusetts Avenue between Alabama Avenue and Southern Avenue.

Washington Metro 
The following Metrorail stations have stops located near Massachusetts Avenue:
 Dupont Circle 
 Mount Vernon Square  
 Union Station 
 Stadium-Armory

Commuter rail
Union Station lies on Massachusetts Avenue at Columbus Circle, and it is served by Amtrak, MARC, and Virginia Railway Express trains.
 Amtrak:
 MARC:
 VRE:

See also
 Charles C. Glover
 Embassy Row

References

External links

 
  
, a project at the University of Virginia School of Architecture
 National Park Service: Massachusetts Avenue Historic District 
 Embassy.org Embassy Row Tour

1871 establishments in Washington, D.C.
Streets in Washington, D.C.
Dupont Circle
Embassy Row
Historic districts on the National Register of Historic Places in Washington, D.C.
Roads on the National Register of Historic Places in Washington, D.C.